Skilvatnet is a lake in Hamarøy Municipality in Nordland county, Norway. The lake Kaldvågvatnet lies just west of this lake.

See also
List of lakes in Norway

References

Hamarøy
Lakes of Nordland